Bush's Brain: How Karl Rove Made George W. Bush Presidential is a book by James Moore and Wayne Slater that chronicles the political career of Karl Rove and the role he has played in the elections of George W. Bush, both when running for Governor of Texas and for president.  It was published in 2003 by John Wiley & Sons, Inc. .

In 2004, a documentary film was directed and produced by Joseph Mealey and Michael Paradies Shoob with the shortened title, Bush's Brain.  In that film, a series of political insiders of both major parties suggest that Karl Rove, President George W. Bush's closest advisor, has almost single-handedly shaped United States executive branch policies, since the days when George W. Bush was running for Governor of Texas.  The documentary film, available on DVD (DVD release date: February 15, 2005, run time: 80 minutes), is narrated by Jacques Vroom, Jr. and contains a  soundtrack featuring the music of singer-songwriter political activist, Michelle Shocked.

Moore and Slater have followed up that book, after the 2004 Presidential election, with Rove Exposed: How Bush's Brain Fooled America (2005) .

Film 

Filmed and narrated in the style of a detective story, the film investigates events that occurred during election.

In one of the film's early scenes, the film contends that Karl Rove, with Republican Bill Clements as his client in a Texas gubernatorial race, contacted the FBI after finding a hidden microphone-transmitter in his office. Following the announcement of the bugging of Rove's office, Bill Clements won the election over the Democratic incumbent, Mark White.

The film was narrated by Jacques Vroom, Jr. and full details, cast and crew can be found on IMDb.

Reception
On Metacritic, the film has a score of 48, indicating "Mixed or average reviews." Lou Lumenick of the New York Post gave the film three stars and called it "one of the better political documentaries flooding into theaters after 'Fahrenheit 9/11' and before the election." Peter Travers of Rolling Stone gave the film three stars out of four.

Other works by the authors

James Moore and Wayne Slater 
The Architect: Karl Rove and the Dream of Absolute Power 
Rove Exposed: How Bush's Brain Fooled America

James Moore 
Bush's War For Reelection: Iraq, the White House, and the People

Notes

References 
James C. Moore and Wayne Slater, Bush's Brain: How Karl Rove Made George W. Bush Presidential, book from John Wiley & Sons, Inc., 2003, .
James C. Moore and Wayne Slater, Rove Exposed: How Bush's Brain Fooled America (2005), .
Joseph Mealey and Michael Paradies Shoob, Bush's Brain, film, 2004.
Joseph Mealey and Michael Paradies Shoob Bush's Brain (film DVD), Studio: Tla Entertainment Group, DVD release date: February 15, 2005, run time: 80 minutes, ASIN: B000B5XP2E.

External links 
Stephen Holden, "FILM REVIEW; Postulating a Dark Side to a Bush Operative's Work," The New York Times, August 27, 2004, web: "Bush's Brain - Review - Movie" (accessed 2006-09-13).

2003 non-fiction books
Books about George W. Bush
Documentary films about American politics
2004 documentary films
Non-fiction books adapted into films
American documentary films